John McIntosh (1876 – after 1897) was an English professional footballer who played as a forward for Sunderland.

References

1876 births
People from Lanchester, County Durham
Footballers from County Durham
English footballers
Association football forwards
Tow Law Town F.C. players
Sunderland A.F.C. players
South Shields F.C. (1889) players
English Football League players
Year of death missing